The following games were initially announced as Game Boy Color titles, however were subsequently cancelled or postponed indefinitely by developers or publishers.

References

 
Game Boy Color games
Game Boy Color